Blepharomastix styxalis is a moth in the family Crambidae. It was described by William Schaus in 1924. It is found in French Guiana.

The wingspan is about 20 mm. The forewings and termen of the hindwings are suffused with brown. There are dark lines on the discocellulars, as well as a faint dark postmedial line.

References

Moths described in 1924
Blepharomastix